Mark Anthony Williams (born May 17, 1971) is a former professional American football player who played linebacker for three seasons for the Green Bay Packers, the Jacksonville Jaguars, the St. Louis Rams, and the Tampa Bay Buccaneers. He played for four teams in his career.  He started for the Jacksonville Jaguars in 1995; starting 12 games before being injured.

References

1971 births
Living people
People from Camp Springs, Maryland
Players of American football from Maryland
American football linebackers
Green Bay Packers players
Jacksonville Jaguars players
St. Louis Rams players
Ohio State Buckeyes football players
Tampa Bay Buccaneers players